Radio DeeJay Ioannina is a radio station broadcasting on 89.6 MHz (stereo and RDS) serving Ioannina, Epirus and parts of the north-western Greece. The station is a mixture of mainstream Top 40 and Dance songs, much of the hits are Top 40. The station launched broadcasting on 9 September 2009, based on a 12-year course of Music FM.

For the last 11 years, it is rebroadcasting part of the program of 95.2 Athens DeeJay, but also gives listeners a rich and vibrant local radio program. The main audience covers the age groups 15–34, financially independent with a mid-range or high educational level, who reside in urban centres. The music program is determined by the current music trends in the international music scene while promoting radio hits that will make a difference in the future.

Slogan
Its slogan is Mono epitixies gia ta Ioannina! (Hits only, for Ioannina!)

External links
Official website

Radio stations in Greece
Mass media in Ioannina